Limosina is a genus of flies belonging to the family Lesser Dung flies.

Species
L. silvatica (Meigen, 1830)

References

Sphaeroceridae
Muscomorph flies of Europe
Sphaeroceroidea genera
Taxa named by Pierre-Justin-Marie Macquart